Miah Lynch (died 28 December 2006) was an Ireland international footballer.

International career
In February 1934, Lynch made his only appearance for Ireland in a 4–4 draw with Belgium in Dublin.

References

Republic of Ireland association footballers
Republic of Ireland international footballers
League of Ireland players
Year of birth missing
Place of birth missing
2006 deaths
Association football defenders